Mario Llanos Méndez (born 5 April 1989) is a Colombian footballer who plays as a defender for Békéscsaba 1912 Előre SE of the Nemzeti Bajnokság II.

Titles
  América de Cali 2011 (Copa Cafam)

References

1989 births
Living people
Colombian footballers
Colombian expatriate footballers
Deportivo Pereira footballers
América de Cali footballers
FC Metz players
Curicó Unido footballers
Békéscsaba 1912 Előre footballers
Categoría Primera A players
Primera B de Chile players
Expatriate footballers in Chile
Expatriate footballers in France
Expatriate footballers in Hungary
Association football defenders
Sportspeople from Valle del Cauca Department